The Bahamas competed at the 1972 Summer Olympics in Munich, West Germany. Twenty competitors, nineteen men and one woman, took part in thirteen events in four sports.

Athletics

Men
Track & road events

Field events

Women
Track & road events

Boxing

Men

Cycling

Two cyclist represented the Bahamas in 1972.

Track
1000m time trial

Men's Sprint

Sailing

Open

See also
Bahamas at the 1971 Pan American Games

References

External links
Official Olympic Reports

Nations at the 1972 Summer Olympics
1972
Olympics